Kimberly Conway Haley (born September 5, 1972) is an American former soccer player who played as a defender, making four appearances for the United States women's national team.

Career
Conway Haley played for the South Side Middle School youth team, as well as the South Side Cyclones in high school, winning a state championship with the latter. In college, she played for the Virginia Cavaliers from 1990 to 1993. She was an NSCAA Second-Team All-American in 1993, and was selected to the All-ACC and All-Academic teams the same year. She was included in the NSCAA All-Region and ACC All-Tournament teams in 1992 and 1993, and was a finalist for the Heisman Trophy in 1993.

Conway Haley made her international debut for the United States on July 7, 1993, in a friendly match against Australia. In total, she made four appearances for the U.S., earning her final cap on July 14, 1993, in a friendly match against Russia.

In club soccer, Conway Haley played for the Long Island Rough Riders, helping the team to win the inaugural season of the USL W-League in 1995. She then joined Puck Deventer in the Netherlands.

Conway Haley is the coach of the Rockville Centre Legacy girls' soccer team. She also coaches local lacrosse. In 2017, Conway Haley was inducted into the Long Island Soccer Player Hall of Fame.

Personal life
Conway Haley grew up in Rockville Centre, New York, where she lives with her husband, Ethan, and her two daughters. She currently works for Condé Nast in Manhattan.

Career statistics

International

References

1972 births
Living people
People from Rockville Centre, New York
Soccer players from New York (state)
American women's soccer players
American women's soccer coaches
United States women's international soccer players
American expatriate women's soccer players
American expatriate sportspeople in the Netherlands
Expatriate women's footballers in the Netherlands
Women's association football defenders
Virginia Cavaliers women's soccer players
USL W-League (1995–2015) players
Condé Nast people
Puck Deventer players
Long Island Rough Riders (USL W League) players